Since We Met: The Best of 1996–2006 is the first compilation album by Canadian singer-songwriter Chantal Kreviazuk. Its tracks include all of her singles except for "Believer", "Hands", and "Souls".

Track listing
"Surrounded" – 5:17
"In This Life" – 3:49
 "Wonderful" – 3:33
"Before You" – 3:52
 "All I Can Do" – 3:36
"God Made Me" – 3:11
"Julia" – 3:42
"Far Away" – 3:47
"Time" – 4:07
"Wayne" – 4:45
"What If It All Means Something" – 4:03
"These Days" - 3:55
"Leaving On a Jet Plane" – 4:40
"Weight of the World" – 3:33
"Dear Life" – 3:28
"Feels Like Home" – 4:41
 "Ghosts of You" – 3:58
"In My Life" – 2:33

References

2008 greatest hits albums
Chantal Kreviazuk albums